Guru Ladho Re Diwas (Punjabi: ਗੁਰੂ ਲਾਧੋ ਰੇ ਦਿਵਸ ) is a festival celebrated among Sikhs, especially Labana Sikhs, commemorates finding of Guru Tegh Bahadur, The ninth Guru of Sikhs, by Baba Makhan Shah Labana. Guru Ladho Re is phrase of Lubanki dialect which means Found the Right Guru.

References

Sikh terminology
Labana